Cypress River is an unincorporated community recognized as a local urban district in the Rural Municipality of Victoria in the Canadian province of Manitoba. Originally, the community was known as "Littleton". On Neil Young's 2005 album Prairie Wind, he makes references to Cypress River in the title track.

Geography
It is located along Highway 2 in south central Manitoba between Tiger Hills to the south, and the sandy hills of Spruce Woods Provincial Park to the north.

Climate

Notable people
Ric Nordman, politician
Florent Robidoux, former professional hockey player
Scott Young, journalist, father of musician Neil Young.

References

Local urban districts in Manitoba